Vladimir Nikolov (born 7 February 2001) is a Bulgarian professional footballer who plays as a forward for Slavia Sofia.

Career
Nikolov began his career with Slavia Sofia where he spent three years. He then joined Dit Sofia at the age of 10.

Septemvri Sofia
On 19 April 2018, Nikolov made his first-team debut in the league match against Etar Veliko Tarnovo. He came off the bench in the 85th minute, replacing Georgi Stoichkov in a 4–2 away loss.

Würzburger Kickers
On 10 September 2020 Nikolov moved to Germany to join the 2. Bundesliga team Würzburger Kickers.

Admira Wacker
On 4 January 2022, Nikolov joined Admira Wacker in Austria from Würzburger Kickers, in exchange for Marco Hausjell moving in the opposite direction.

Career statistics

Club

References

External links
 

2001 births
Living people
Bulgarian footballers
Bulgaria youth international footballers
Bulgaria under-21 international footballers
Association football forwards
FC Septemvri Sofia players
Würzburger Kickers players
FC Admira Wacker Mödling players
First Professional Football League (Bulgaria) players
2. Bundesliga players
3. Liga players
Austrian Regionalliga players
Austrian Football Bundesliga players
Bulgarian expatriate footballers
Expatriate footballers in Germany
Bulgarian expatriate sportspeople in Germany
Expatriate footballers in Austria
Bulgarian expatriate sportspeople in Austria